The Government Seal of Bangladesh ( Bangladesh Sarkarer Sil) is the official seal of the People's Republic of Bangladesh. It is used by the Government of Bangladesh in official documents including passports.

The seal features the same design elements as the first flag of Bangladesh in a circular setting. The outer white ring is shown with the caption of the official name of the Government of the People's Republic of Bangladesh with four red 5-pointed stars, symbolising  nationalism, socialism, democracy, secularism the four key principles of the Republic enshrined in the  Constitution. In the centre is the country map on a red disc.

History of the seal
The seal was adopted as the temporary National Emblem of Bangladesh by the Provisional Government of the People's Republic of Bangladesh popularly known as the Mujibnagar Government, which was the government in exile of Bangladesh based in Kolkata, India, during the Bangladesh Liberation War. Formed in early April 1971, the provisional government confirmed the declaration of independence of East Pakistan made earlier in the same year by Bengali nationalist leader Sheikh Mujibur Rahman on 26 March.

References

Bangladesh
National symbols of Bangladesh
Bangladesh